Olivença is a municipality located in the western of the Brazilian state of Alagoas.

References

Municipalities in Alagoas